Cufar is a town in the Tombali Region of southern Guinea-Bissau.

Transport
The town is served by Cufar Airport.

Populated places in Guinea-Bissau
Tombali Region